Archive Series may refer to:

 Archive Series Volume No. 1, an album by Iron & Wine
 Archive Series No. 1: Live in Iceland, an album by Violent Femmes
 Archive Series No. 2: Live in Chicago Q101, an album by Violent Femmes
 Archive Series (The Korgis album)